Librairie L'Androgyne was an LGBT-oriented bookstore in Montreal, Quebec, Canada, active from 1973 to 2002.

Founded in the fall of 1973 by a collective headed by Will Aitken and Bruce Garside (the active partners), and John Southin (who did not work on the store but put up capital). Barbara Scales was active in setting up the feminist section of the store. The store was originally located on Crescent Street at a time when the city's gay village was still centred on the nearby Stanley Street. The store specialized in LGBT literature,  feminist literature, and non-sexist children's books,  stocking titles in both English and French.

Being one of the very few places outside of bars where queer people could congregate, L'Angrogyne became a centre of cultural and political activity. Displaying posters for events, selling tickets for concerts and hosting meetings were only some of the activities undertaken especially when it became a volunteer collective operation in the coming years. We saw one another in daylight in a place dedicated to openness and community. Everyone including researchers came by since the book collection was open to the public and in many ways unparalleled.

In the spring of 1975, Bruce Garside and Will Aitken wanted to withdraw from active responsibility for keeping the store going. It was taken over by Frank Brayton, with the help of Kirk Kelly.

By 1976 the store was entirely operated by a group of volunteers none of whom owned it or received any compensation. While the composition of the group was in constant flux, a core group of individuals kept it open. There were debates within the collective about the philosophy and politics of the bookstore, as evidenced in the April 17, 1977 meeting minutes which state that "Androgyny people have come together because of the store and sugger from a consequential lack of, or uncertainty about, philosophy, direction and community within the collective." In its first location, the bookstore shared space with the anarchist bookstore Black Rose.

For most of its history, it was one of just four LGBT-oriented bookstores in Canada, alongside Glad Day Bookshop in Toronto, Little Sister's in Vancouver and After Stonewall in Ottawa. In addition to selling books, Androgyny Bookstore hosted dances and other events.

In 1982, the store moved to a small upstairs location on Saint Laurent Boulevard. The store was acquired the following year by two of the volunteers, Philip Rappaport and Lawrence Boyle. In 1986 Boyle took sole possession of the store,  moving it to the larger ground floor location where it became best known. In the 1980s, the store, like Glad Day and Little Sister's, ran into issues with Canada Customs frequently delaying or blocking shipments of books to the store.

Boyle sold the store to France Désilets in 1995; Désilets, in turn, sold the store to Bernard Rousseau, the owner of the Priape chain, in 2001, although she stayed on as the store's manager. In the same year, the store moved to its final location, on Amherst Street (now named Rue Atateken) in the relocated Gay Village. Due to the early 21st-century decline of LGBT-oriented independent bookstores across North America, however, the store closed by 2002; unlike Glad Day, which survived in this era by adding sex-related merchandise, such as gay and lesbian pornography, to its catalogue, Rousseau opted not to do so as he would mainly have been cannibalizing his own sales at Priape.

In Montreal, there is the feminist and queer bookstore, L’Euguelionne, which acknowledges Librairie Androgyne as its predecessor.

References

1973 establishments in Quebec
2002 disestablishments in Quebec
Independent bookstores of Canada
LGBT bookstores
LGBT culture in Montreal
LGBT literature in Canada
Shops in Montreal